KPGS (88.1 FM, Four Corners Public Radio) is a radio station broadcasting an album adult alternative music format. It is licensed to Pagosa Springs, Colorado, United States. The station is currently owned by Kute and features programming from National Public Radio and Public Radio International.

KPGS broadcasts in the HD Radio format.

References

External links
 
 

PGS